The Moon (XVIII) is the eighteenth trump or Major Arcana card in most traditional tarot decks. It is used in game playing as well as in divination.

Description
The card depicts a night scene, where two large pillars are shown. A wolf and a domesticated dog howl at the Moon while a crayfish emerges from the water. The Moon has "sixteen chief and sixteen secondary rays" and "[is] shedding the moisture of fertilizing dew in great drops" (totaling 15 in the Rider–Waite deck) which are all Yodh-shaped.

Interpretation
According to A.E. Waite's 1910 book The Pictorial Key to the Tarot, "The card represents life of the imagination apart from life of the spirit... The dog and wolf are the fears of the natural mind in the presence of that place of exit, when there is only reflected light to guide it... The intellectual light is a  reflection and beyond it is the unknown mystery which it cannot reveal." Additionally, "It illuminates our animal nature" and according to Waite,  "the message is 'Peace, be still; and it may be that there shall come a calm upon the animal nature, while the abyss beneath shall cease from giving up a form.'"

Waite writes that the Moon card carries several divinatory associations:

18.THE MOON--Hidden enemies, danger, calumny, darkness, terror, deception, occult forces, error.  Reversed: Instability, inconstancy, silence, lesser degrees of deception and error.

Alternative decks
 In the "Flemish Deck" by Vandenborre, the moon shows a woman seated in the right-hand corner with a tree in the left hand corner. The Moon is directly above her. She is shown with a distaff in her right hand and spinning thread with her left hand.
 In the 17th Century French Vieville tarot deck, instead of the above scene there is an older woman beside a tree, spinning with a spindle and distaff as the Moon shines above.

In Other Media 
In the manga JoJo's Bizarre Adventure tarot cards are used to name the character's powers, named 'Stands' one of the characters in Stardust Crusaders, Imposter Captain Tennille, has a stand named Dark Blue Moon, named after tarot card. Dark Blue Moon is a powerful humanoid Stand with many fish-like features whose capabilities are maximized when underwater. Its abilities range from attaching power-draining barnacles to creating whirlpools.

In the Adventure Time miniseries Stakes, one of the members of the Vampire King's court is named after The Moon.

References

  The Pictorial Key to the Tarot, by Arthur Waite
 A. E. Waite's Pictorial Key to the Tarot: Being fragments of a Secret Tradition under the Veil of Divination. 1910
Juliette Wood, Folklore 109 (1998):15–24, The Celtic Tarot and the Secret Tradition: A Study in Modern Legend Making (1998)

External links

 The History of the Moon Card from The Hermitage.
 The Moon from Joan Bunning's Learning the Tarot: A Tarot Book for Beginners

Moon, The
Moon in art